Paitoon Smuthranond (1 July 1931 – 10 July 2017) was a Thai sports shooter. He competed in the 50 metre pistol event at the 1964 Summer Olympics. He also competed at the 1966 Asian Games and won a silver medal in team events.

References

1931 births
2017 deaths
Paitoon Smuthranond
Paitoon Smuthranond
Shooters at the 1964 Summer Olympics
Place of birth missing
Asian Games medalists in shooting
Shooters at the 1966 Asian Games
Paitoon Smuthranond
Medalists at the 1966 Asian Games
Paitoon Smuthranond